Hugo Armando and Leonardo Mayer were the defending champions.
Santiago González and Travis Rettenmaier defeated Michael Quintero and Fernando Vicente 1–6, 6–3, [10–3] in the final.

Seeds

Draw

Draw

References
 Doubles Draw

Club Premium Open - Doubles
2009 Club Premium Open